Marasmarcha colossa is a moth of the family Pterophoridae. It is found in Russia (the West Siberian plain), Turkmenistan., Kyrgyzstan, Kazakhstan, Afghanistan and Tajikistan.

References

Moths described in 1920
Exelastini
Taxa named by Aristide Caradja